Warn London is a 1934 British thriller film directed by T. Hayes Hunter and starring Edmund Gwenn, John Loder and Leonora Corbett. It was based on a novel by Denison Clift.

Premise
A detective goes undercover to infiltrate a gang planning a bullion robbery.

Cast
 Edmund Gwenn - Doctor Herman Krauss 
 John Loder - Inspector Yorke / Barraclough 
 Leonora Corbett - Jill 
 D. A. Clarke-Smith - Doctor Nicoletti 
 Garry Marsh - Van Der Meer 
 John Turnbull - Inspector Frayne 
 Douglas Stewart - Davis 
 Raymond Lovell - Prefect

References

External links

1934 films
1930s thriller films
Films directed by T. Hayes Hunter
Films based on American novels
British black-and-white films
British thriller films
1930s English-language films
1930s British films